Puppy Creek Plantation, also known as the McGregor-Lamont House, is a historic plantation house located near Rockfish, Hoke County, North Carolina. It was built about 1821, and is a two-story, three bay, Federal style frame dwelling.  It is sheathed in weatherboard, has a gable roof, and sits on a high brick pier foundation.  It features exterior end brick chimneys and full-width front porch.

It was listed on the National Register of Historic Places in 1976.

The McGregor-Lamont House is likely the site of a wedding referred to by North Carolina writer Charles W. Chesnutt in his conjure tale "The Marked Tree," first published in the journal The Crisis.

References

Plantation houses in North Carolina
Houses on the National Register of Historic Places in North Carolina
Federal architecture in North Carolina
Houses completed in 1821
Houses in Hoke County, North Carolina
National Register of Historic Places in Hoke County, North Carolina
1821 establishments in North Carolina